End-of-life may refer to:

 End-of-life (product), a term used with respect to terminating the sale or support of goods and services
 End-of-life care, medical care for patients with terminal illnesses or conditions that have become advanced, progressive and incurable
 End of Life Vehicles Directive, European Community legislation

See also
 The Shouting End of Life, a 1995 album by Oysterband
 End All Life Productions, a French record label
 Near-death (disambiguation)
 EOL (disambiguation)
 EOS (disambiguation)